The 1964 Masters Tournament was the 28th Masters Tournament, held April 9–12 at Augusta National Golf Club in Augusta, Georgia. A field of 96 players entered the tournament and 48 made the 36-hole cut at 148 (+4).

Arnold Palmer, age 34, opened with three rounds in the 60s and led by five strokes after 54 holes at 206 (−10). He carded a final round of 70 on Sunday to win by six strokes to become the first four-time winner of the Masters. It was his seventh and final major victory.

Craig Wood, the 1941 champion, played in his final Masters, but withdrew before completing the first round. Prior to his win at Augusta, he was the runner-up in the first two Masters in 1934 and 1935.

Labron Harris Jr. won the Par 3 contest with a score of 23.

Palmer was later joined as a four-time winner at Augusta by Jack Nicklaus in 1972 and Tiger Woods in 2005; Nicklaus won his fifth in 1975 and a record sixth in 1986.

Field
1. Masters champions
Jack Burke Jr. (4), Jimmy Demaret, Doug Ford (4,8), Ralph Guldahl, Claude Harmon, Ben Hogan, Herman Keiser, Cary Middlecoff (2), Byron Nelson, Jack Nicklaus (2,4,8,10), Arnold Palmer (2,3,8,9,11), Gary Player (3,4,8,9,10), Gene Sarazen, Sam Snead (8), Art Wall Jr. (8,10), Craig Wood
Henry Picard did not play.

The following categories only apply to Americans

2. U.S. Open champions (last 10 years)
Tommy Bolt, Julius Boros (8,9,11), Billy Casper (8,11), Jack Fleck, Ed Furgol (8), Gene Littler (8,11)

Dick Mayer (8) did not play

3. The Open champions (last 10 years)

4. PGA champions (last 10 years)
Jerry Barber, Dow Finsterwald (8,9,10,11), Chick Harbert, Jay Hebert, Lionel Hebert (9), Bob Rosburg

5. U.S. Amateur and Amateur champions (last 10 years)
Deane Beman (6,7,a), Charles Coe (6,7,a), Richard Davies (6,a), Labron Harris Jr. (6,a)

Harvie Ward did not play. Other champions forfeited their exemptions by turning professional.

6. Members of the 1963 U.S. Walker Cup team
Robert W. Gardner (a), Downing Gray (a), Billy Joe Patton (a), R. H. Sikes (7,a), Charlie Smith (a), Ed Updegraff (a)

7. 1963 U.S. Amateur quarter-finalists
Richard Guardiola (a), Johnny Owens (a), Steve Spray (a), Walter Stahl (a)

George Archer forfeited his exemption by turning professional.

8. Top 24 players and ties from the 1963 Masters Tournament
Wes Ellis, Don January (9), Tony Lema (9,11), Billy Maxwell (9,10,11), Bobby Nichols (9), Johnny Pott (11), Mason Rudolph, Dan Sikes (9), Mike Souchak, Bo Wininger

9. Top 16 players and ties from the 1963 U.S. Open
Walter Burkemo, Jacky Cupit, Mike Fetchick, Paul Harney, Davis Love Jr., Dave Ragan (10,11), Dean Refram

10. Top eight players and ties from 1963 PGA Championship
Gardner Dickinson, Jim Ferrier, Al Geiberger, Tommy Jacobs, Bill Johnston

11. Members of the U.S. 1963 Ryder Cup team
Bob Goalby

12. Two players selected for meritorious records on the fall part of the 1963 PGA Tour
Rex Baxter, Jack Rule Jr.

13. One player, either amateur or professional, not already qualified, selected by a ballot of ex-Masters champions
Dave Marr

14. One professional, not already qualified, selected by a ballot of ex-U.S. Open champions
Phil Rodgers

15. One amateur, not already qualified, selected by a ballot of ex-U.S. Amateur champions

Bill Hyndman was selected but later withdrew with a shoulder injury

16. Two players, not already qualified, from a points list based on finishes in the winter part of the 1964 PGA Tour
Gay Brewer, Don Fairfield

17. Foreign invitations
Alfonso Angelini, Al Balding, Peter Butler, Antonio Cerdá, Bob Charles (3,8), Chen Ching-Po (8), Gary Cowan (a), Bruce Crampton (8,9,10), Gerard de Wit, Bruce Devlin, Juan Antonio Estrada (a), Jean Garaïalde, Harold Henning, Geoffrey Hunt, Tomoo Ishii, Stan Leonard (8), Sebastián Miguel, Kel Nagle (3), Enrique Orellana, Chi-Chi Rodríguez, Miguel Sala, Ramón Sota, Dave Thomas, Retief Waltman, Nick Weslock (a)

Numbers in brackets indicate categories that the player would have qualified under had they been American.

Round summaries

First round
Thursday, April 9, 1964

Source:

Second round
Friday, April 10, 1964

Source:

Third round
Saturday, April 11, 1964

Source:

Final round
Sunday, April 12, 1964

Final leaderboard

Sources:

Scorecard

Cumulative tournament scores, relative to par

References

External links 
 Masters.com – Past winners and results
 Augusta.com – 1964 Masters leaderboard and scorecards

1964
1964 in golf
1964 in American sports
1964 in sports in Georgia (U.S. state)
April 1964 sports events in the United States